Troubled Waters may refer to:
 Moving-image works:
 Troubled Waters (2006 film), Canadian thriller
 "Troubled Waters", a 1975 episode of the TV series Columbo
 British films:
 Troubled Waters (1964 film), British re crime, directed by Stanley Goulder
 Troubled Waters (1936 film), British, mystery directed by Albert Parker
 Prose works:
 Troubled Waters, short-fiction anthology in Merovingen Nights science fiction series
 Troubled Waters (novel), English translation of 1895 Ichiyō Higuchi novel
Troubled Waters, a song by Chris Brown from Indigo, 2019
"Troubled Waters" (Victor Crone song), 2020

See also
Troubled Water, 2008 Norwegian film
 Musical works of Paul Simon:
 Bridge over Troubled Water, album
 "Bridge over Troubled Water" (song)